Hot House is an album by Arturo Sandoval, released through N2K Records in 1998. In 1999, the album won Sandoval the Grammy Award for Best Latin Jazz Performance.

Track listing
All songs composed by Arturo Sandoval, unless noted otherwise.

 "Funky Cha-Cha"– 5:50
 "Rhythm of Our World" – 5:12
 "Hot House" (Tadd Dameron) – 5:01
 "Only You (No Se Tu)" (Armando Manzanero) – 3:24 (Patti Austin, vocals)
 "Sandunga" – 4:59
 "Tito" – 5:34
 "Closely Dancing" – 4:39
 "Mam-Bop" – 4:55
 "New Images" – 4:55
 "Cuban American Medley" (Ballard MacDonald, James F. Hanley, Buddy Kaye, Sidney Lippman, Fred Wise, Jack Norworth, Albert Von Tilzer) – 4:55
 "Brassmen's Holiday" (Mario Ruiz Armengol) – 4:55

"Cuban American Medley" contains portions of "Back Home Again in Indiana" (MacDonald, Hanley), "Take Me Out to the Ball Game" (Norworth, Von Tilzer), and the theme from the Little Lulu theatrical shorts (Kaye, Lippman, Wise). It also incorporates snippets of "The Girl I Left Behind" and "Yankee Doodle."

References

1998 albums
Arturo Sandoval albums
Grammy Award for Best Latin Jazz Album